İpek Emiroğlu (born 1992) is a Turkish female association football referee.

Early life
İpek Emiroğlu was born 1992 in Denizli, Turkey. She is a student of Veterinary medicine at Uludağ University in Bursa.

Referee career
Emiroğlu began her referee career in a Men's U-21 League match as the fourth official in her hometown in 2009. She served in several matches of the different Boys' Leagues, Regional Amateur League, TFF Third League and in all levels of the Women's leagues as  assistant referee. She debuted as referee in a Women's Second League match on December 1, 2013, and served first time as referee in the Women's First League on November 9, 2014.

İpek Emiroğlu is the youngest ever female football referee in Turkey.

References

Living people
1992 births
Sportspeople from Denizli
Bursa Uludağ University alumni
Turkish football referees
Turkish sportswomen
Women association football referees